Taj Al-Din Ebrahim ibn Rushan Amir Al-Kurdi Al-Sanjani (or Sinjani; Persian:تاج الدين ابراهيم كردی سنجانی)‎ (1218 – 1301), titled Sheikh Zahed (or Zahid) Gilani, was an Iranian Grandmaster (murshid-i kamil) of the famed Zahediyeh Sufi order at Lahijan. He is also known as Sultân-ûl Khalwatiyya and Tadj’ad-Dīn Ebraheem Zāheed al-Geylānī as well.

According to Minorsky and Elwell-Sutton at the Encyclopaedia of Islam, the tomb of Sheikh Zahed is situated a few miles to the south of the town of Lankaran.

Life

Since the mid-13th century, Sheikh Zahed has been revered as a spiritual authority and his tomb near Lahijan in Iran's Gilan Province, on the shores of the Caspian Sea, draws numerous pilgrims to the village of Sheikhanvar.  His ancestors came from the ancient Iranian city of Sanjan in Khorasan (located in present-day Turkmenistan). Fleeing the Seljuq invasion that would eventually conquer large parts of Persia, his ancestors settled in Gilan in the late 11th century. Taj Al-Din Zahed Gilani was able to attain cultural and religious influence on the Ilkhanid rulers (1256–1353), descendants of Genghis Khan, who followed Seljuq rule.

His most notable disciple was Safi-ad-din Ardabili (1252–1334), the Eponym of the Safavid dynasty (1501–1736). He wed Zahed's daughter Bibi Fatima and, overgoing the interest of Zahed's firstborn son, Gamal Al-Din Ali, was entrusted with the Grand Master's Zahediyeh Sufi Order, which he transformed into his own, the Safaviyya (Sufi order) Order. Zahed Gilani's second-born son, Sadr al-Dīn, wed Safi Al-Din's daughter from a previous marriage.  170 years after Safi Al-Din's death (and 200 years after the death of Sheikh Zahed Gilani) Safaviyya had gained sufficient political and military power to claim the Throne of (Northern) Iran for the Safavid Heir, Shah Ismail I Safavi. The two families were to be intertwined for many centuries to come, by blood as well as mutual spiritual causes.

The Sil-silat-al-nasab-e Safaviyeh or Genealogy of the Safavids, was written by Pir Hossein Abdul Zahedi, a 17th-century descendant of Zahed Gilani. This hagiography in praise of the Safavid forebears, was devoted to the genealogy of the Safavid Sufi masters.

The Turkish Bayrami and Jelveti orders also  had their origin in Zahed Gilani's Zahediyeh Sufi Order.

See also
 List of Persian poets and authors

References

Further reading

 
 
 
 
 Yves Bomati and Houchang Nahavandi,Shah Abbas, Emperor of Persia,1587-1629, 2017, ed. Ketab Corporation, Los Angeles, English translation by Azizeh Azodi.
 E.G. Browne. Literary History of Persia. (Four volumes, 2,256 pages, and twenty-five years in the writing). 1998.  
 Jan Rypka, History of Iranian Literature. Reidel Publishing Company. 1968 . 
 Derwische im Vorhof der Macht. Franz Steiner Verlag, Stuttgart 1993, ISBN 3-515-05758-7.

1218 births
1301 deaths
Iranian Sufi religious leaders
Safaviyeh order
Kurdish Sufis